National Institute of Cholera and Enteric Diseases or NICED (also known as ICMR-NICED) is an Indian medical institute that conducts research and develops prevention and treatment and control strategies related to enteric diseases and HIV/AIDS. The headquarter of  NICED is located at Kolkata, West Bengal. NICED is affiliated to and financed by Indian Council of Medical Research.

History 
Eastern India and the Gangetic Plain have had a long history of cholera and related epidemics. Indian Council of Medical Research (ICMR) set up a cholera research centre at Kyd Street, Kolkata, West Bengal. The aim of establishing this centre was to conduct research related to cholera and other enteric diseases. In 1979, the cholera research centre was renamed to National Institute of Cholera and Enteric Diseases (NICED). In 1980 the institute received the World Health Organization's recognition as "WHO Collaborative Centre for Research and Training on Diarrhoeal Diseases".

During the COVID-19 pandemic in India (2020), NICED and their microbiologists and researchers played an important role. According to a news article published in The New Indian Express in April 2020, the scientists were working round the clock in shifts.

Recognition 
In 1968 the institute was given the status of "International Reference Centre for Vibrio Phage Typing" by the World Health Organization (WHO). In 1980 the institute received the recognition as "WHO Collaborative Centre for Research and Training on Diarrhoeal Diseases".

References

External links 
 

Medical research institutes in India
Research institutes in Kolkata
1962 establishments in West Bengal
Research institutes established in 1962
Research institutes in West Bengal
Indian Council of Medical Research